Kardos is a village in Békés County, in the Southern Great Plain region of south-east Hungary.

Geography
It covers an area of 42.79 km2 and has a population of 632 people (2015).

References

Populated places in Békés County